The 2022 Knoxville Challenger was a professional tennis tournament played on indoor hard courts. It was the 18th edition of the tournament which was part of the 2022 ATP Challenger Tour. It took place in Knoxville, United States between 7 and 13 November 2022.

Singles main-draw entrants

Seeds

 1 Rankings are as of October 31, 2022.

Other entrants
The following players received wildcards into the singles main draw:
  Blaise Bicknell
  Gage Brymer
  Martin Damm

The following player received entry into the singles main draw as an alternate:
  Ethan Quinn

The following players received entry from the qualifying draw:
  Alexander Bernard
  Giles Hussey
  Cannon Kingsley
  Strong Kirchheimer
  Tristan McCormick
  Iñaki Montes de la Torre

Champions

Singles

 Ben Shelton def.  Christopher Eubanks 6–3, 1–6, 7–6(7–4).

Doubles

 Hunter Reese /  Tennys Sandgren def.  Martin Damm /  Mitchell Krueger 6–7(4–7), 7–6(7–3), [10–5].

References

2022 ATP Challenger Tour
2022
2022 in American tennis
November 2022 sports events in the United States
2022 in sports in Tennessee